The Institute of Chartered Accountants of Barbados (ICAB) is a professional accountancy body in Barbados.  It is the sole organisation in Barbados with the right to award the Chartered Accountant designation.
ICAB is a member of the International Federation of Accountants (IFAC).
ICAB is also a member of the Institute of Chartered Accountants of the Caribbean.

References

Accounting in Barbados
Professional associations based in Barbados
Member bodies of the International Federation of Accountants